Pigot is an English surname. 

The Pigot Baronetcy is a title in the Baronetage of Great Britain.

Derivation and variants
The name Pigot is derived from Picot. The latter is recorded as a given name in the Domesday Book, but its origin is not clear. William Camden suggested a derivation from Old French picote meaning pock-marked, freckled.

Pigott, Piggott and Pickett are variant forms.

People with the surname Pigot
Mary Pigot (daughter of Gervase Pigot), former wife of Sir Robert Burdett, 3rd Baronet (1640–1716)
George Pigot, 1st Baron Pigot (1719–1777), governor of Madras
British Major General Henry Pigot, in Malta in 1800 for the French surrender
John Edward Pigot (1822–1871), Irish music collector
Edward Pigot (1858–1929), Irish/Australian Jesuit priest, seismologist and astronomer
Robert Pigot (disambiguation), various people
Hugh Pigot (disambiguation), various people
Neil Pigot (born 1961), Australian actor
Spencer Pigot (born 1993), American racing driver

Fictional characters 
Serafine Pigot, a character in the 1997 An American Werewolf in Paris motion picture

See also
Pigot (disambiguation): other meanings
Pigott (surname)

References

Surnames of English origin